Thomas Lynch is a professor at the University of Washington School of Drama. He teaches graduate students exclusively in opera scenery design.

Education
Lynch completed his MFA at Yale under the supervision of Chinese American theatrical set designer Ming Cho Lee.

Career 
Before joining the University of Washington, Lynch worked as a freelance set designer in New York City for about 30 years. He has produced over 250 designs in major American theaters. He was previously a lecturer at NYU's Tisch School of the Arts.

Awards 
 2008 Seattle Opera Artist of the Year Award - Der Fliegende Holländer and Iphigénie en Tauride (Winner)
 2005 Obie Award for Design - Woman Before a Glass (Winner)
 2001 Entertainment Design Award (EDDY) – Ring (winner)
 2000 Tony Award for Best Scenic Design nomination - The Music Man
 1999 Obie Award for Sustained Excellence – Betty’s Summer Vacation (Winner)
 1989 Tony Award for Best Scenic Design nomination - The Heidi Chronicles
 16th Elliot Norton Award for Outstanding Designer - Game of Love and Chance (Winner)

Works 
 Der Ring des Nibelungen (2013 by Richard Wagner) – scenic designer. Produced by Seattle Opera 2013
 One Act Plays (2013 by Tennessee Williams) – scenic designer. Produced by Glenn Hughes Penthouse Theatre
 Iphigénie en Tauride (2011 by Christoph Willibald Gluck) – scenic designer. Produced by the Metropolitan Opera 2011
 Rodelinda (2011, by George Frideric Handel) – scenic designer. Produced by the Metropolitan Opera
 A Raisin in the Sun (2004 by Lorraine Hansberry) – scenic designer. Produced by Royale Theatre 
 The Music Man (2000-2001 by Meredith Willson) – scenic designer. Produced by Neil Simon Theatre

References 

Living people
American set designers
University of Washington faculty
Yale School of Art alumni
Year of birth missing (living people)